Cnemaspis thachanaensis is a species of geckos endemic to Thailand.

References

Cnemaspis
Reptiles of Thailand
Reptiles described in 2017